Beckenham Hill railway station is in the London Borough of Lewisham in south London, very close to the border with Bromley.

It is in Travelcard Zone 4, and the station and all trains are operated by Thameslink.  It serves the mainly residential areas of Southend Road and Downham as well as parts of Bellingham.

Services
All services at Beckenham Hill are operated by Thameslink using Class 700 EMUs.

The typical off-peak service in trains per hour is:

 2 tph to London Blackfriars
 2 tph to  via 

In addition, the service to London Blackfriars is extended to and from  via .

Connections
London Buses route 54 serve the station.

References

External links

Railway stations in the London Borough of Lewisham
Former London, Chatham and Dover Railway stations
Railway stations in Great Britain opened in 1892
Railway stations served by Govia Thameslink Railway